Khentrul Lodrö Thayé Rinpoche (Khentrul Rinpoche) is a Tibetan Buddhist lama of the Nyingma school. He is the abbot of Mardo Tashi Choling in Eastern Tibet, where he established a retreat center and shedra, a formal Buddhist monastic college, under the direct guidance of his teacher, Khenchen Jigme Phuntsok Rinpoche. He directs the education and spiritual practice of three hundred monks, seventy advanced-degree candidates, sixty children, and twenty full-time retreatants.

Khentrul Rinpoche obtained Khenpo degrees directly from Khenchen Jigme Phuntsok Rinpoche at Larung Gar, from Katog Moktsa Rinpoche at Katog Monastery and from Kyabje Penor Rinpoche at Namdroling. Nowadays, Khentrul Rinpoche is primarily based in the U.S. where he has established Katog Rithrod Mountain Retreat Center in the Ozark Mountains of northwest Arkansas, as well as dozens of branch centers in different states which he travels to teach at on a yearly basis. 

He founded a non-profit organization, Katog Choling, in 2004.

Early life and education

Early life
At the age of seven he began the formal practice of the Dharma by taking monastic ordination as a supportive foundation. He left his home and family when he was a young child to go and live with his maternal uncle, Terton Jigme Dorje, at Katog Mardo Tashi Choling in Tibet.

Education
Khentrul Rinpoche studied and practiced under Khenchen Jigme Phuntsok Rinpoche for over twenty years at Serthar monastery (Larung Gar), at Katog Monastery under Katog Moktsa Rinpoche in Tibet, and with Penor Rinpoche at Namdroling Monastery in India. He earned Khenpo degrees (equivalent to a PhD in Buddhist philosophy) in each of the monasteries directly from the three of these masters.

Recognition
Katog Moktsa Rinpoche formally recognized Khentrul Rinpoche as a reincarnation (tulku) of Katog Drubtobchhenpo Namkha Gyamtso, a mahasiddha of the Katog lineage. An elaborate enthronement ceremony was held for him at Katog Gonpa's mother monastery in 2006 amongst an assembly of monks, lamas, khenpos, and laypersons. Thus, he is called Khentrul—someone who is both a khenpo and a tulku.

He received the entire Nyingt'hig lineage (including Nyingt'hig Yabzhi, Dzod Dun, Ngalso Korsum, Yeshe Lama, and Chetzun Nyingt'hig), as well as thousands of empowerments, scriptural transmissions, and explanations on the pith instructions for Great Perfection practice. In addition, Khentrul Rinpoche received the rarely bestowed oral transmission of Khenpo Ngakchung's Nyingt'hig lineage. From Dodrubchen Rinpoche, Jigme Phuntsok Rinpoche, Katok Moktsa Rinpoche, and Penor Rinpoche, he received all of the empowerments and scriptural transmissions for the Kama and Terma cycles of the Nyingma school.

He was invited to the U.S. by Chagdud Tulku Rinpoche (shortly before his death), primarily to create and teach a shedra program at Rigdzin Ling. He created an annual shedra at Chagdud Rinpoche's Gonpa center at Rigdzin Ling in Junction City, California in 2003. Since then, the Shedra has continued yearly and since 2010 it takes place annually at Katog Rit'hröd Mountain Retreat located in northwest Arkansas.

As a highly respected teacher, Khentrul Rinpoche attracts thousands of students worldwide. The first American practice center was founded in Ashland, Oregon in 2003. He now has multiple practice centers in the U.S. He founded a non-profit organization, Katog Choling, in 2004. In 2007, one hundred and twenty acres were donated to Katog Choling in northwest Arkansas to serve North American students. As of 2018, the land has increased to almost four hundred acres of contiguous properties (including private property purchased by practitioners to do retreat). This includes a large central temple, stupas, a traditional three year retreat center and smaller temple, dorms, other retreat facilities and natural supports for practice, like mountains, cliffs, caves and streams.

Khentrul Rinpoche also travels to teach in various countries and invites various qualified lamas to teach at the Katog Choling (USA) centers including: Katog Getse Rinpoche, Khenchen Tsultrim Lodro Rinpoche, and Kadak Choying Dorje Lingtrul Rinpoche
. 
He is known for highly emphasizing the Lojong ('Mind Training') teachings and techniques.

Sources
This article uses GFDL-licensed material from the RangjungYesheWiki article  Khentrul Lodro Thaye Rinpoche.

External links
 

Living people
Nyingma lamas
Rinpoches
Year of birth missing (living people)